David de Jesus Mourão-Ferreira, GCSE (February 24, 1927 in Lisbon – June 16, 1996 in Lisbon) was a Portuguese writer and poet from Lisbon.

He was a son of David Ferreira (b. 1898) and wife Teresa de Jesus Ferro Mourão (b. 1907). He studied Romanic Philology in 1951 in the University of Lisbon and in 1957 became a Professor.

He married firstly Maria Eulália Barbosa Valentim de Carvalho, sister of Rui Valentim de Carvalho, of now EMI-Valentim de Carvalho label, and maternal aunt of Manuela Moura Guedes' first husband, by whom he had issue, and secondly Maria do Pilar de Jesus Barata, without issue.

In 2005, the University of Bari and the Instituto Camões dedicated to him the Cátedra David Mourão-Ferreira

Poems
1954 – Tempestade de Verão (awarded by Delfim Guimarães) 
1958 – Os Quatro Cantos do Tempo
1962 – In Memoriam Memoriae
1962 – Infinito Pessoal ou A Arte de Amar 
1966 – Do Tempo ao Coração  (Of The Time to The Heart)
1967 – A Arte de Amar (combination of previous works) 
1969 – Lira de Bolso 
1971 – Cancioneiro de Natal (awarded by Nacional de Poesia) 
1973 – Matura Idadeaa
1974 – Sonetos do Cativo (Captive Sonnets)
1976 – As Lições do Fogo 
1980 – Obra Poética (Poetic Works) (includes a guitar and a violin) 
1985 – Os Ramos e os Remos
1988 – Obra Poética, 1948-1988 (Poetic Works, 1948–1988)
1994 – Música de Cama (erotic anthology with an unedited book)

Narrative fictions
1959 – Novelas de Gaivotas em Terra (awarded by Ricardo Malheiros)
1968 – Os contos de Os Amantes (The Stories of the Loved Ones)
1980 – As Quatro Estações (awarded by the International Association of Literary Critics)
1986 – Um Amor Feliz (A Happy Love)
1987 – Duas Histórias de Lisboa (Two Histories of Lisbon)

See also
Instituto Camões

External links
Photos and a few poems
GeneAll.net David de Jesus Mourão Ferreira
Centro Studi Lusofoni – Cátedra David Mourão-Ferreira

References

1927 births
1996 deaths
20th-century Portuguese poets
Portuguese male poets
University of Lisbon alumni
People from Lisbon
20th-century male writers